The 1968–69 WCHL season was the third season of the Western Canada Hockey League. Eight teams completed a 60-game season, with the Flin Flon Bombers winning the President's Cup.

League business
The Western Canada Junior Hockey League changed its name to the Western Canada Hockey League (WCHL) on June 8, 1968, and broke away from the Canadian Amateur Hockey Association (CAHA) and affiliated with the new Canadian Hockey Association instead. Ron Butlin was named president of both of the WCHL and the Canadian Hockey Association. The league changed its name since it no longer conformed to the CAHA age limit of 19, but rather raised its age limit to 21. The Regina Pats chose to withdraw from the WCHL, and play in the Saskatchewan Amateur Junior Hockey League under the jurisdiction of the Saskatchewan Amateur Hockey Association. Butlin expected the WCHL to go ahead with the remaining ten teams separated into two divisions, but actively searched for prospective owners of a team in Regina, Saskatchewan. The WCHL sought for payments from the National Hockey League (NHL) as per the existing NHL Entry Draft agreement in which CAHA were paid for developing future professional players.

On July 20, 1968, Butlin suspended the Moose Jaw Canucks from the WCHL for failure to fulfill financial obligations to the league. The Canucks then joined then Saskatchewan Amateur Junior Hockey League, becoming the second former WCHL team to do so. The Weyburn Red Wings later withdrew from the WCHL due to concerns of increased operating costs, and were the third team to join the Saskatchewan Amateur Junior Hockey League. As of August 13, eight of the eleven teams from the WCJHL remained with the WCHL

Regular season
The WCHL was split into two four-team divisions with an interlocking season schedule.

In February 1969, the Dauphin Kings in the Manitoba Junior Hockey League challenged the validity of the Canadian Hockey Association contract when it signed Butch Goring from the  Winnipeg Jets. Merv Haney also departed the Jets for the Kings, and Butlin stated that the WCHL would seek a court injunction to prevent both from playing for Dauphin and take legal action to seek damages.

Final standings

Scoring leaders
Note: GP = Games played; G = Goals; A = Assists; Pts = Points; PIM = Penalties in minutes

League playoffs
Butlin arranged for the WCHL to compete in an east-west national championship of the Canadian Hockey Association, against the champions of the Western Ontario Junior A Hockey League. WCHL playoffs were the first team to eight points would win series.

Quarterfinals
Calgary defeated Swift Current 8 points to 0
Edmonton defeated Saskatoon 8 points to 0
Estevan defeated Brandon 8 points to 2
Flin Flon defeated Winnipeg 9 points to 5

Semifinals
Flin Flon defeated Estevan 9 points to 1
Edmonton defeated Calgary 9 points to 5

Finals
Flin Flon defeated Edmonton 8 points to 4

National championship
The national final was scheduled to begin April 25 versus the Western Ontario Junior A Hockey League champion. The Flin Flon Bombers and St. Thomas Barons played in the CHA east-west national final for the Father Athol Murray Trophy. It was arranged as a best-of-seven series to begin in St. Thomas, Ontario. The series would be the first Canadian national junior ice hockey championship not under the jurisdiction of the CAHA.

The Barons withdrew from the championship series during the fourth game, played at the Whitney Forum in Flin Flon on May 5. The team left after an on-ice brawl during the second period. The referee defaulted the game to the Bombers, who were leading by a 4–0 score at the time. The Bombers led the series three games to one after the default win. Game five was scheduled in Flin Flon on May 7, and games six and seven would have been in St. Thomas if necessary.

The Barons were escorted from the arena to their hotel by the Royal Canadian Mounted Police, and abandoned the series in the interest of player safety. The team departed for St. Thomas on May 6, despite game five being scheduled for the next day. The Canadian Press described the Barons as being over-matched in the series and were not up to the calibre of WCHL teams. On May 7, Butlin awarded the series and the championship to the Flin Flon Bombers.

All-star game
The 1968–69 WCHL all-star game was held in Flin Flon, Manitoba, with the WCHL All-stars and Flin Flon Bombers ending in a 4–4 draw before a crowd of 2,100.

Awards

All-star team
Goaltender: Ray Martyniuk, Flin Flon Bombers
Defenceman: Dale Hoganson, Estevan Bruins
Defenceman: Herb Howdle, Estevan Bruins 
Centerman: Bobby Clarke, Flin Flon Bombers 
Left winger: Greg Polis, Estevan Bruins
Right winger: Reggie Leach, Flin Flon Bombers

See also
1968 in sports
1969 in sports

References

Western Hockey League seasons
WCHL